Lohani, also known as Nuhani, is a Pashtun tribal sub-group from among the Lodi tribe. They migrated to their present-day location in Tank, Frontier Region Tank, Lakki Marwat and Dera Ismail Khan in modern-day Pakistan by crossing the Gomal Pass during the late 1500s, coinciding with the final years of the Mughal Emperor Akbar's reign. Although other Lohani tribes had also made earlier deeper incursions into India, as far as Bihar, and settled therein during the days of the Lodi dynasty.

History

Earliest mentions of the Lohani 
The earliest mention of the Lohani tribes comes in the form of an inscription written on a tablet from 1496 AD in Bihar during the days of the Lodi dynasty. The inscription records the construction of a certain gate by Darya Khan Nuhani who is thereafter mentioned as one of the ''governors of the kingdom". The Lohani tribes were also mentioned by the Mughal Emperor Babur in his memoirs, the Baburnama, as Nuhani Afghans around 1529 AD. The earliest records mentions them as Nuhani rather than Lohani, which is the primary designation by which they are currently known today.

References

Bettani Pashtun tribes
Pashto-language surnames
Pakistani names